Cornufer neckeri is a species of frog in the family Ceratobatrachidae.

It is found in Papua New Guinea and Solomon Islands.
Its natural habitat is subtropical or tropical moist lowland forests.
It is threatened by habitat loss.

References

neckeri
Amphibians described in 1949
Taxonomy articles created by Polbot